Draparnaudia subnecata is a species of air-breathing land snail, terrestrial pulmonate gastropod mollusk in the superfamily Partuloidea. This species is endemic to New Caledonia.

References

Draparnaudiidae
Endemic fauna of New Caledonia
Gastropods described in 1995
Taxonomy articles created by Polbot